Rania Zaghir (Arabic: رانيا زغير|) is a Lebanese writer and publisher of Arabic children books, several of which have been translated.

Biography

Rania Zaghir was born on 23 July 1977 in Beirut, Lebanon, to Syrian parents who emigrated to Lebanon in 1960. Aged ten, Zaghir moved with her family to Syria, escaping the Lebanese civil war; there, she met her grandmother K. Rustom, who grew apple orchids, the inspiration for her book Sisi Malaket Talbas Kharofan Wa Dodatayn. Zaghir refers to her childhood years as happy despite the ongoing civil war. Her home life was characterized by strong family ties.

Zaghir attended the same school from kindergarten to grade 12. In 1995, Zaghir passed the entrance exams and was accepted at The Lebanese American University, where she earned a BA in Communication Arts. In 1999, she started the MA program in educational psychology at American University of Beirut. Zaghir recalls doing little work, preferring to read Amin Maalouf, Nazek Saba Yared, and Truman Capote.

She married French-Lebanese engineer David Samer Sabra. They have two boys together.

About 
Zaghir's books have earned her numerous awards. Haltabees Haltabees earned the Berlin International Literature Festival Book Award (The Extraordinary Book 2015).  She has also won the Anna Lindh Euro-Mediterranean Foundation for the Dialogue Between Cultures Award (2010), as well as Assabil (Friends of Public Libraries) 2009 Annual Award for Children's Literature granted to her in recognition of her book “Sisi Malakit Talbas Kharofan wa Dodatayn” (Al Khayyat Al Saghir Publishing House - The Little Tailor). This book has been translated into Italian and published by Serendapita, while “Lamma Balatet el Baher” has been translated into Korean and “Man Lahasa Karna il Booza” into 19 languages and is published by Edition Orient – Berlin.

She is also the co-founder and curator of the International biannual children's literature conference known as: What a Story!

In 2013, She established a national book charity: Libraries of Hope.

In 2007, Zaghir founded Al Khayyat Al Saghir Publishing House.

Awards 
Zaghir's books have earned her numerous awards

Beirut earned the Beirut BookFair Best Children's Book Award in 2016.

Haltabees Haltabees earned the Berlin International Literature Festival Book Award (The Extraordinary Book 2015).

The Anna Lindh Euro-Mediterranean Foundation for the Dialogue Between Cultures Award (2010).

Assabil (Friends of Public Libraries) 2009 Annual Award for Children's Literature granted to her in recognition of her book “Sisi Malakit Talbas Kharofan wa Dodatayn” (Al Khayyat Al Saghir Publishing House - The Little Tailor).

Publications 

 2018: Fikreyyeh
 2016: khkhkh, Kuttab Laysa An Harf Al Khaa 
 2015: Al-Khayyat Al Saghir
 2014: Haltabees, Ashaar Min Sumsum Wa Khayrat
 2011: Haltabees, Haltabees
 2010: Man Lahasa Qarn Al-Bootha
 2009: Limatha Amtarat Al Samaa Koursa wa Waraq Inab
 2009: Sissi Malaket Talbasu Kharufan Wa Dudatayn
 2007: Lamma Ballat El Bahr
 2005: Sabbat Ayyam Fi Olbat Alwan
 2004: Hal Raaita Ahroufi
 2001: Akhi Al Sagheer

References

External links 

 

Living people
1977 births